"Everything's Tuesday" is a song, written by Holland-Dozier-Holland (using the pseudonym Edyth Wayne) with Daphne Dumas and Ron Dunbar. When released as a single, performed by American group Chairmen of the Board and produced by Holland-Dozier-Holland, it was a hit.

Chart performance
It was first released in 1970 in the US with "Patches" as the B-side, reaching 38 on the Billboard Hot 100. It entered the UK Singles Chart in February 1971 with a B-side of "Bless You", reaching number 12 and staying for nine weeks on the chart.

References

Chairmen of the Board songs
Songs written by Holland–Dozier–Holland
1970 songs
1970 singles
Song recordings produced by Brian Holland
Song recordings produced by Lamont Dozier
Songs written by Ron Dunbar